Olearia exiguifolia commonly known as small-leaved daisy bush, is a species of flowering plant in the family Asteraceae and is endemic to south-western Australia. It is an erect or straggly shrub with broadly egg-shaped leaves with the narrower end towards the base, and white and yellow, daisy-like inflorescences.

Description
The upper surface of the leaves is dark green and the lower surface covered with woolly, cream- to rust-coloured hairs.

Taxonomy
Small-leaved daisy bush was first formally described in 1865 by Ferdinand von Mueller who gave it the name Aster exiguifolius in Fragmenta Phytographiae Australiae from specimens collected by George Maxwell. In 1867, George Bentham changed the name to Olearia exiguifolia in Flora Australiensis. The specific epithet (exiguifolia) means "small-leaved".

Distribution and habitat
Olearia exiguifolia mainly grows in scrub on sand dunes and is widely distributed in southern inland areas of Western Australia and in south-western South Australia as far east as the Eyre and Yorke Peninsulas.

References

External links
Olearia exiguifolia images & occurrence data from Atlas of Living Australia

Taxa named by Ferdinand von Mueller
Plants described in 1865
Flora of Western Australia
Flora of South Australia
exiguifolia